Dahimi-ye Do (also Romanized as Daḥīmī-ye Do) is a village in Howmeh-ye Gharbi Rural District, in the Central District of Dasht-e Azadegan County, Khuzestan Province, Iran. At the 2006 census, its population was 129, in 21 families.

References 

Populated places in Dasht-e Azadegan County